Tomáš Filippi (born May 4, 1992) is a Czech professional ice hockey player. He is currently playing with HC Bílí Tygři Liberec of the Czech Extraliga (ELH).

Playing career
Filippi made his Czech Extraliga debut playing with HC Bílí Tygři Liberec during the 2012–13 Czech Extraliga season. After three seasons within the Czech Extraliga, Filippi left Liberec in signing a three-year contract with Russian club, Metallurg Magnitogorsk of the Kontinental Hockey League (KHL) on April 2, 2015.

Career statistics

Regular season and playoffs

International

Awards and honors

References

External links
 

1992 births
Living people
Amur Khabarovsk players
Czech ice hockey forwards
Baie-Comeau Drakkar players
HC Bílí Tygři Liberec players
Metallurg Magnitogorsk players
Quebec Remparts players
People from Rychnov nad Kněžnou
Sportspeople from the Hradec Králové Region
Czech expatriate ice hockey players in Canada
Czech expatriate ice hockey players in Russia